Johannes Baur (13 December 1795 – 24 November 1865) was an Austrian businessman who opened the first hotel in Zürich, Switzerland, in 1838. Baur en Ville still operates in Zürich's Paradeplatz today.

Early life and career 
Baur was born in Götzis, in the Austrian state of Vorarlberg, in 1795. His father, Johannes, was a customs officer and innkeeper.

A journeyman baker in his early years, Baur left Austria in the mid-1820s and emigrated to Zürich, via Rheinau, initially running the Zum Kirschbaum in Marktgasse, opposite the confectioner David Sprüngli, co-founder of Lindt & Sprüngli.

In 1836, Baur bought the building in Zürich which had previously served as a parsonage and opened Café Baur right next to the city's most important post office. Together with his wife, Anna Knechtli, Baur converted the house into a hotel between 1836 and 1838 according to plans by architect Daniel Pfister, and, on 24 December 1838, opened Baur en Ville as the city's first hotel. 140 beds and stables for 36 to 40 horses were available at the time.

Baur en Ville should not be confused with Baur au Lac, on Lake Zürich, which was also built by Baur in 1844.

After Baur's death, Heinrich Brunner took over the hotel, and in 1899 sold it to the property speculator Jakob Lassmann from Constantinople. In 1899, the architects Alfred Chiodera and Theophil Tschudy approved a reconstruction and extension project in the French Renaissance style, but it was not carried out. Lassmann's speculations led to financial ruin and the hotel was sold to Jakob Schwarz.

Personal life 
In 1826, Baur married Anna Knechtli, with whom he had at least one known child, son Theodor, who was born in 1828.

In 1859, both Johannes and Theodor were made honorary citizens of Zürich, in recognition of their improvements of the architectural notability of the city.

Death 
Baur died in Zürich on 24 November 1865, aged 69. His wife survived him by two years.

References 

1795 births
1865 deaths
19th-century Austrian businesspeople
People from Vorarlberg
Austrian emigrants to Switzerland
Austrian businesspeople
Austrian hoteliers